A. K. Veerasamy was an Indian actor who had acted over 500 in Tamil  films in supporting and minor roles. One verse that he spoke of in the Mudhal Mariyadhai film, Enakku Oru Unmai Therinchavunum dialogue is still far from the minds of the people. Veerasamy was the vice president of the South Indian Actors' Association.

Early career 
He acted in plays with Sivaji Ganesan them Like Rajput, he is famous for his roles. His dialogue "Enaku oru unma therinjaaganum" (I need to know the truth) from the film Mudhal Mariyadhai became popular.

Family 
His wife's name is Rajalakshmi. The couple has 4 sons and one daughter.

Awards 
He acted Gemini Ganesan's Unnaipol Oruvan movie. for that, he also got a National Award for his role in that movie.

Death 
He died on 22 August 2010 at the age of 84 following an age-related illness.

Filmography 
This is a partial filmography. You can expand it.

1950s

1960s

1970s

1980s

1990s

2000s

References

External links 
 

1920s births
2010 deaths
Year of birth uncertain
Male actors in Tamil cinema
Male actors from Tamil Nadu
Indian male stage actors
Tamil male actors